Castella is a small, unincorporated community in the upper Sacramento Canyon of Shasta County, California. It is located 46 miles north of Redding on Interstate 5, and is home to Castle Crags State Park. Its population is 214 as of the 2020 census, down from 240 from the 2010 census. It has a Chevron gas station/store and a post office. The ZIP Code is 96017. The community is inside area code 530.

Commerce and tourism
Located in the Shasta Cascade area of Northern California, Castella sees many visitors and has a number of summer homes in the area.  Visitors use Castella as a base to engage in nationally recognized trout fishing in the nearby Sacramento McCloud and  Klamath, Rivers, or come to see and climb Mount Shasta, Castle Crags or the Trinity Alps.  Visitors also engage in nearby skiing (both alpine and cross-country), or bike or hike to the waterfalls, streams and lakes in the area, including nearby Mossbrae Falls, Lake Siskiyou, Castle Lake and Shasta Lake.

Politics
In the state legislature Castella is located in the 1st Senate District, represented by Republican Ted Gaines, and in the 1st Assembly District, represented by Republican Brian Dahle.

References

Unincorporated communities in California
Unincorporated communities in Shasta County, California